Pioneer Stadium is a soccer and track & field stadium owned and operated by California State University, East Bay in Hayward, California, United States. It currently hosts the East Bay Pioneers soccer and track & field teams. The stadium also hosts the East Bay FC Stompers of the National Premier Soccer League (NPSL) since the team's debut season at this stadium in 2016.

History

Pioneer Stadium hosted the Cal State Hayward Pioneers football (back when the school was called California State University, Hayward). While the football team has historical success, most notably the 1969 team with a 9–1 record, the team later discontinued in 1993 due to financial issues and poor attendance. Since then, the stadium and the school have been without a football team. There has been talk of bringing football back to California State University, East Bay, but the possibility of it is unclear.

In 1980, the stadium was the initial home field for the Golden Gate Gales of the American Soccer League (ASL).

In 2010, the stadium hosted the short-lived, but successful FC Gold Pride of the Women's Professional Soccer (WPS) league, until the team discontinued in November of that year.

Transportation 
The stadium is accessible by the CSUEB Shuttle bus and AC Transit bus route 60. Both of which go from the Hayward BART Station to the bus stop next to the stadium at the intersection of Carlos Bee Blvd. and W. Loop Road.

See also
 Pioneer Amphitheatre
 Pioneer Gym

References

Cal State Hayward Pioneers football
National Premier Soccer League stadiums
Women's Professional Soccer stadiums
Athletics (track and field) venues in California
Soccer venues in California
Soccer in the San Francisco Bay Area
Sports venues in Alameda County, California
Buildings and structures in Hayward, California
1964 establishments in California
Sports venues completed in 1964